Elampalloor  is an urban village in Kollam district in the state of Kerala and is a part of Kollam Metropolitan Area, India. It is 12 km away from Kollam city, 23 km away from Paravur and 13 km away from Kottarakkara.

Demographics
 India census, Elampalloor had a population of 28473 with 13783 males and 14690 females.

Public/Private Institutions near Elampalloor
 Kollam Technopark
 Aluminium Industries Limited (ALIND)
 The Kerala Ceramics Limited
 Kerala Electrical and Allied Engineering Co. Ltd. (KEL)
 Lakshmi Starch Ltd

References

Villages in Kollam district